Thirsty Ghost is a studio album by Sara Gazarek.

The album earned a Grammy nomination for Best Jazz Vocal Album.

References

2019 albums
Sara Gazarek albums